Otto Berg (24 August 1906 in Bolsøy, Molde – 10 April 1991) was a Norwegian long jumper.

At the 1936 Summer Olympics he finished tenth in the long jump final with a jump of 7.30 metres. He won the silver medal at the 1934 European Championships in Athletics. He became Norwegian champion in long jump in 1931 and 1934-1936.

His personal best jump was 7.53 metres, achieved in August 1934 on Bislett stadion.

In 1934 he won the Egebergs Ærespris.

References

1906 births
1991 deaths
People from Molde
Norwegian male long jumpers
Athletes (track and field) at the 1936 Summer Olympics
Olympic athletes of Norway
European Athletics Championships medalists
Sportspeople from Møre og Romsdal
20th-century Norwegian people